Ciberbit, Produções de Software S.A. is a Portuguese software and multimedia developer based in Coimbra. It developed the CBRetail Software, a powerful tool aimed at people in the area of commerce or retail.

Founded in 1995, and a pioneer in developing software in Portugal, Ciberbit was the first company to release a commercial videogame, Portugal 1111: A Conquista de Soure, which was completely produced and designed inside Portugal, making it an important milestone for the Portuguese software industry.

Ciberbit also worked in partnership with Microsoft TV to create multiplayer games for future TV devices.

References

External links
Ciberbit Official website 
Portugal 1111: A Conquista de Soure website at Ciberbit.pt 
Developer page at IGN
Developer page at GameFAQs.com

Software companies of Portugal
Video game development companies
Video game companies of Portugal